New York City's 36th City Council district is one of 51 districts in the New York City Council. It is represented by Democrat Chi Ossé.

Geography
District 36 is based largely in the Brooklyn neighborhood of Bedford–Stuyvesant, also covering some of northern Crown Heights.

The district overlaps with Brooklyn Community Boards 2, 3, and 8, and with New York's 7th, 8th, and 9th congressional districts. It also overlaps with the 18th, 20th, and 25th districts of the New York State Senate, and with the 43rd, 53rd, 54th, 55th, 56th, and 57th districts of the New York State Assembly.

Recent election results

2021
In 2019, voters in New York City approved Ballot Question 1, which implemented ranked-choice voting in all local elections. Under the new system, voters have the option to rank up to five candidates for every local office. Voters whose first-choice candidates fare poorly will have their votes redistributed to other candidates in their ranking until one candidate surpasses the 50 percent threshold. If one candidate surpasses 50 percent in first-choice votes, then ranked-choice tabulations will not occur.

2017

2013

References

New York City Council districts